R. J. Reynolds Vapor Company is an American electronic cigarette company based in Winston-Salem, North Carolina.

Overview
The company is a subsidiary of Reynolds American Inc., which is the parent company of R. J. Reynolds Tobacco Company, American Snuff Company, Santa Fe Natural Tobacco Company and Niconovum AB. 

The company began offering the Vuse Digital Vapor Cigarette in limited distribution in 2012, expanding availability to the state of Colorado in 2013.

References

External links

Elf Bar Vapes

R. J. Reynolds Tobacco Company
Companies based in North Carolina
Companies based in Winston-Salem, North Carolina
Electronic cigarette manufacturers